Jeffrey Lynn James (September 29, 1941 – May 7, 2006), nicknamed "Jesse", was an American professional baseball pitcher. He played in Major League Baseball (MLB) from –, for the Philadelphia Phillies. James appeared in 35 career games, winning six, including one shutout (versus the Chicago Cubs on July 17, 1968). He threw and batted right-handed.

James had three children, two from his first marriage to Linda Donnelly. Kimberly Lynne was born in 1966 and Kelly Lynne was born in 1968. Jeff Jr., his third child, was born during his second marriage. James Sr. contracted lung cancer and died from the illness in 2006.

References

External links

Jeff James at Baseball Gauge

1941 births
2006 deaths
Major League Baseball pitchers
Baseball players from Indiana
Philadelphia Phillies players
Hawaii Islanders players
Eugene Emeralds players
San Diego Padres (minor league) players
Indiana State Sycamores baseball players
Deaths from lung cancer
Deaths from cancer in Indiana
Chattanooga Lookouts players
Elmira Pioneers players
Florida Instructional League Phillies players
Macon Peaches players
Magic Valley Cowboys players
Miami Marlins (FSL) players